Ninja Five-O, known in the PAL region as Ninja Cop, is an action platform video game developed by Hudson Soft and published by Konami. It was released for the Game Boy Advance in North America and Europe in April 2003. Players take the role of Joe Osugi, a ninja who must stop a terrorist group influenced by mystical masks. It was first announced at "Konami Gamers' Day" in early 2003.

The game received generally positive reviews from video game critics, but it failed to garner sales and is often regarded as one of the most sought-after handheld games.

Gameplay
Ninja Five-O is an action game is centered around Joe Osugi, a ninja tasked with stopping a terrorist group influenced by the Mad Masks, masks that give the wearer obscene power. As Osugi, the player must defeat the terrorists and rescue hostages through five missions with three levels and a boss battle.

Development
The game was developed by Hudson Soft. Ninja Five-O was first announced in January 2003 during "Konami Gamers' Day", where they announced along with fifteen other games they would publish in 2003. Despite being developed and published by Japanese video game companies, it was never released in Japan for reasons unknown. The US box art was illustrated by Julie Giles, who designed other Konami packaging such as the Castlevania and Metal Gear franchises. Ninja Five-O was released in North America and Europe in April 2003.

Reception

Upon release of the game, Ninja Five-O received "favorable" reviews according to the review aggregation website Metacritic. It was chosen as runner-up for "GBA Game of the Month" by IGN for the month of April 2003, behind Golden Sun: The Lost Age.

In a retrospective review from Nintendo Life, Perry Wild praised its level design for having a balance between the platforming and combat aspects in the game.

Ninja Five-O received awards and nominations from several gaming publications. GameSpy named it the third best Game Boy Advance game of 2003, as well as the Best Platform Game for the system. It was also chosen as the "Best Game No One Played" by IGN. IGN later listed it at number 23 in their list of the top 25 Game Boy Advance games of all time. In 2008, CraveOnline featured the game among top 10 Ninja games of all time, calling it "weird, fun, challenging, and a great homage to another awesome ninja game from the 8-bit era, Shadow of the Ninja". According to GameFan, "Ninja Five-O was one of the biggest sleeper hits of 2003. Given lackluster sales it’s unlikely to spawn a sequel, but with everything it got right the first time one can only imagine what might have been."

Ninja Five-O is now seen as one of the most sought-after games for the Game Boy Advance, with IGN listing it as "Extremely Rare". By 2013, Pocket Gamer listed it as one of the most expensive handheld games, noting that a copy of the game was being sold on eBay for £70 while a boxed copy went for £200.

References

External links
 

2003 video games
Game Boy Advance games
Game Boy Advance-only games
Hudson Soft games
Konami games
Video games about ninja
Video games about police officers
Platform games
Side-scrolling video games
Video games developed in Japan